Liotyphlops beui is a species of nonvenomous snake in the family Anomalepididae. The species is native to northeastern Argentina, eastern Paraguay, and central-western, southeastern, and southern Brazil; the Reptile Database restricts its range to Brazil. It is locally common in Brazil. It is sometimes known as the pale-headed blindsnake.

Etymology
The specific name, beui, is in honor of "T. Beu" who collected the type specimen.

Geographic range
According to the IUCN, L. beui is found in northeastern Argentina, eastern Paraguay, and in the Goiás, Mato Grosso, Minas Gerais, Paraná, and São Paulo states of Brazil. According to the Reptile Database, it is only found in the Brazilian states of Espírito Santo, Goiás, Minas Gerais, Paraná, Rio Grande do Sul, and São Paulo.

The type locality is Butantan, in São Paulo, Brazil.

Habitat and behavior
L. beui is a fossorial snake that is found in Cerrado savanna as well as in evergreen and semi-deciduous forests. Based on snakes brought to the Instituto Butantan (São Paulo), it is most active during the rainy season. Captive specimens are active on the surface of the ground mostly during early dark hours of night.

Reproduction
L. beui is oviparous.

References

Further reading
Amaral A (1924). "Helminthophis ". Proceedings of the New England Zoological Club 9: 25–30. (Helminthophis beui, new species, p. 29).

Anomalepididae
Reptiles of Argentina
Reptiles of Brazil
Reptiles of Paraguay
Reptiles described in 1924
Taxa named by Afrânio Pompílio Gastos do Amaral